The Tomb of Mian Ghulam Kalhoro is a religious shrine situated in Hyderabad, Sindh, Pakistan. It is the burial place of Mian Ghulam Shah Kalhoro who died in 1772 and is believed to be the founder of the city of Hyderabad in Pakistan as well as the second most important figure in Sindh after Shah Abdul Latif Bhittai. It is the oldest building in Hyderabad.

Description
The shrine is built inside a rectangular shaped fort. The interior of the tomb is a wonderful example of Sindhi art which is decorated with gildings, arc shaped windows and tiles. The arc-shaped windows are filled with terracotta grilles of geometrical patterns.

Upkeep
The walled enclosure of the tomb area has gradually been filled by graves of other people, turning it into a graveyard. Since 2011, its preservation has been placed in charge of the government of the province of Sindh.

The domed roof of the tomb fell in the early 20th century, and was replaced by a flat roof. It has since been restored.

Gallery

References

External links 
Tomb of Mian Ghulam Shah Kalhoro, pre-restoration, by Government of Sindh
Ghulam Shah Kalhora, Hyderabad, Sindh, pre-restoration, by Marvi Mazhar, 2015

Mausoleums in Sindh
Buildings and structures in Hyderabad, Sindh
Religious buildings and structures completed in 1772
Tourist attractions in Hyderabad, Sindh